American actress and singer Tisha Campbell has released one studio albums, eight singles and eight music videos.

Albums

Singles

Featured singles

References

Pop music discographies
Contemporary R&B discographies
Discographies of American artists